The Petite Aiguille is a mountain of the Pennine Alps, situated near Bourg Saint Pierre in Switzerland. It is located on the ridge Les Maisons Blanches in the Grand Combin massif.

References

External links
 Petite Aiguille on Hikr

Mountains of the Alps
Alpine three-thousanders
Mountains of Valais
Mountains of Switzerland